William Benedict (April 16, 1917 – November 25, 1999), was an American actor, perhaps best known for playing "Whitey" in Monogram Pictures' The Bowery Boys series.

Early years 
Benedict was born in Haskell, Oklahoma, After his father's death when Billy was three years old, his mother supported him and his two sisters. He took part in school theatricals, and on leaving school he made his way to Hollywood.

Career 
Benedict's first film was $10 Raise (1935) starring Edward Everett Horton, which launched the blond-haired young man on a busy career. He almost always played juvenile roles, such as newsboys, messengers, office boys, and farmhands.

In 1939, when Universal Pictures began its Little Tough Guys series to compete with the popular Dead End Kids features, Billy Benedict was recruited into the cast. These films led him into the similar East Side Kids movies (usually playing a member of the East Side gang, but occasionally in villainous roles). The East Side Kids became The Bowery Boys in 1946, and Benedict stayed with the series (as "Whitey") through the end of 1951.

Other films included My Little Chickadee (1940) starring W. C. Fields and Mae West, The Ox-Bow Incident (1943), Ed Wood's Bride of the Monster (1955), The Sting (1973) and Farewell, My Lovely (1975). Benedict never shook his juvenile image completely, and continued to play messengers and news vendors well into his sixties. He also worked often in television commercials, and in television series, including The Andy Griffith Show, All in the Family, and The Tonight Show Starring Johnny Carson.

Death
Benedict died at age 82 on November 25, 1999, at Los Angeles' Cedars-Sinai Medical Center, following heart surgery.

Selected filmography

References

External links

American male film actors
Male actors from Oklahoma
20th-century American male actors
1917 births
1999 deaths
Burials at Forest Lawn Memorial Park (Glendale)
People from Haskell, Oklahoma